The Basin Reserve, officially known as the Cello Basin Reserve for sponsorship reasons, and commonly referred to as the Basin, is a cricket ground in Wellington, New Zealand. It has been used for Test matches, and is the main home ground for the Wellington Firebirds first-class team. The Basin Reserve is the only cricket ground to have New Zealand Historic Place status (Category 2) as it is the oldest Test cricket ground in the country. The ground has been used for events other than cricket, such as concerts, sports events and other social gatherings, but now it is mostly used for cricket, particularly Test matches. 

The New Zealand Cricket Museum is located in the Old Grandstand. It houses cricket memorabilia and a reference library. It opened in 1987, and was relaunched in 2021.

Location

The Basin Reserve is two kilometres south of the Wellington CBD at the foot of Mount Victoria. Government House, St Marks Church School, and the Wellington College boys' school are to the south of the Basin, across the street. At the eastern end of the basin is the Mount Victoria Tunnel, which increased the traffic flow around the Basin Reserve when it was built in 1931.

The Basin Reserve is also surrounded by numerous other Wellington landmarks, including Mount Cook Barracks, the National War Memorial, several colleges and high schools, the Caledonian Hotel and the former Dominion Museum. A fire station is located across the street from the ground: traditionally its occupants would watch ongoing matches during their down-time, and would set off the station's siren to mark New Zealand wickets taken or when a batsman reached a milestone like a 50 or century. The Basin Reserve is the intersection point for the Wellington suburbs of Mount Cook, Newtown and Mount Victoria.

Construction history
The area that is now Basin Reserve was originally a lake (known as the Basin Lake), and there were plans to connect it to the sea by a canal to make it an alternative inner city harbour, with major warehouses and factories alongside it. Due to the colonists' English roots, sport, particularly cricket, was a vital part of the community's way to relax. However, no land had been allocated by the city planners for recreational reserves. Although natural grounds, such as the Te Aro flat, provided a small area for matches, the colonists wanted more recreational land than they had. The matter became dire as buildings began to be erected on these plains, as flat land was hard to find in the mountainous Wellington. So, after the 1855 earthquake, which historians estimate measured magnitude 8, influential citizens seized the chance in 1857 to suggest that the new land be drained and made into a recreational reserve. The Wellington council accepted the proposal and on 3 February 1863 prisoners from the Mount Cook Gaol began to level and drain the new land. The swamp was drained by September and a fence and hedges were placed around the entire area. However, massive population influxes from 1863 to 1866 (caused mostly by the Parliament being situated in Wellington) hampered construction on the Basin Reserve as workers were pulled to other areas.

After a council meeting on 11 December 1866 the Basin Reserve became Wellington's official cricket ground. No cattle or horses were allowed in the ground and only small hedges and shrubs were allowed to be planted so as not to hamper cricket games. Soon after, on 11 January 1868, the first game of cricket was played, although the ground had numerous stones and thistles on it, which the umpire later apologised for as some players got injured from them. Although it was the opening day, no ceremony or music was played, nor was the opening advertised with banners.

Soon after that first event, the Highland Games began to be held at the Basin Reserve. The games were organised by the Wellingtonian Caledonian Society, of which their headquarters, The Caledonian Hotel, still stands towards the south of the Basin Reserve. The society offered up prize money which brought many competitors to the region. Due to their success, the society petitioned to have new grandstands built at the western end of the Basin Reserve. They would measure  and would cost approximately £250–£300. The stands would also hold food stalls and ground keepers. However, for the following years, even up until reportedly 1872, the Basin Reserve grounds were still extremely swampy, with small pools of swamp water and various weeds and shrubs sprouting over the fields. In late 1872, horses were used to level the playing field and this greatly improved the conditions.

In 1882, the William Wakefield Memorial was erected at the Basin Reserve. The monument had been in storage for many years, and it was finally erected to commemorate one of the city's founders, William Wakefield, at the main sports ground.

The pavilion has been a Category II registered Historic Place since 1982, and the entire Basin Reserve has been a registered Historic Area since 1998. The William Wakefield Memorial has a Category I registration.

In 2012 the Museum Stand of the Basin was declared an earthquake risk and closed; a new player's pavilion was opened in December 2018 and renamed in 2020 in honour of the former Test cricketer Ewen Chatfield.

Event history

The first ever event played on the Basin Reserve was a one-day cricket match on 11 January 1868 between the Wellington Volunteers and the crew of HMS Falcon, which was docked in Wellington. However, the game was hampered with injuries from numerous stones and thistles in the grass, which led to the injury of some players. The umpire apologised after the game to the players for the poor conditions of play.

After that first event, local societies began organising athletic and sport meetings at the Basin Reserve. These meetings were eventually called the Highland Games and it was their success which led to the construction of the ground's grand stand. The events included athletics, racing, dancing and later wood-chopping and cycling. However, the ground was still swampy in some areas, but was remedied in late 1872. This allowed the first first-class game,  Wellington against Auckland, to be played on 30 November 1873, which Wellington won easily. Another first at the Basin Reserve is reputedly what was the first game of rugby in the North Island. The first rugby game held at the Basin Reserve was between the Wellington football team and the crew of HMS Rosario, which the sailors won by a single goal.

The Australasian athletic championships were held at Basin Reserve on 26–27 December 1911. These were a combined Australian and New Zealand championship in which New Zealanders won all the track events and Australians won all the field events.

Before sailing on the 1921–22 Kangaroo tour of Great Britain, the Australian rugby league team stopped in Wellington for an exhibition match at the Basin Reserve.

 The first Test match played at the ground was between New Zealand and England, beginning on 24 January 1930. One-day international cricket was played at the Basin Reserve until 1999, after which it moved to the larger crowd capacity Westpac Stadium on the other side of Wellington. In what may be a one-off occasion, it returned during the Australian Tour in 2005 following a decision that the pitch at Hamilton's Westpac Park was unfit for cricket, however it is scheduled to host two more One-day internationals against Pakistan in 2017/18 and  One-day international against India in 2018/19.

On 13 March 2011, the Basin Reserve was host to "Fill the Basin" a cricket event intended to raise money for the 2011 Canterbury earthquake. The game was played in front of more than 10,000 people with people sitting between the boundary rope and the fence. This is the biggest crowd at the Basin Reserve in the modern era. Players involved in the match included Shane Warne, Stephen Fleming, Tana Umaga, Richard Hadlee, Martin Crowe, other famous former New Zealand cricketers, current All Blacks Richie McCaw and Conrad Smith  and actors Russell Crowe, Ian McKellen. More than $500,000 was raised towards the relief efforts.

In addition to cricket, other sports have also used the Basin Reserve, including rugby union, a rugby league Test match, a football pre-season match and exhibition Australian rules football matches. The Basin Reserve was during the 1950s and 1960s the major football ground in the Wellington area and was the scene of a number of international matches and Chatham Cup finals.

Statistics

Test matches

There have been 64 Test matches played at the Basin Reserve as of September 2020. The average runs per wicket is 31.42 while the average runs per wicket through New Zealand is 31.27. The average runs per over is 2.85. The ground is more noted as suiting fast bowlers as opposed to  spin bowlers. Nine of the top ten wicket takers at the ground are fast bowlers with top wicket taker being Chris Martin with 58  although he only has the 13th best bowling average on the ground.

Brendon McCullum has the highest innings, 302, and is the first Black Cap to pass 300 runs in a test.  The previous highest score at the ground and for any NZ test cricketer was the 299 runs by Martin Crowe in 1991  Almost a year later in 2015, Kumar Sangakkara scored his 12000th test runs and his 11th double century there while McCullum dropped three catches and scored a two-ball duck in the first innings.  It is also a ground where Trent Boult made the most of his one-handed catches.  One of which was the one that removed Sangakkara in 2015.  In the same test, Kane Williamson scored his first test double century, with his 6th wicket partner BJ Watling scoring a century in the second innings.  Williamson also contributed on the field to help NZ win the test match.  His catch also made the top play on Sports Center in America In 2017, this is also the ground where Henry Nicholls scored his maiden test century. Late in that year, Tom Blundell scored his maiden Test century on debut, then walked home while still in uniform as he lives near the ground.

The highest total set by a team here in Test cricket was by the New Zealand national cricket team when they scored 680/8 dec on 14 Feb 2014 against the Indian national cricket team. The most runs scored in this ground have been by Ross Taylor- 1279 runs, Kane Williamson (1137 runs) and Martin Crowe (1123 runs). The most wickets have been taken by Chris Martin- 60 wickets, followed by Daniel Vettori-57 wickets and Richard Hadlee- 53 wickets.

ODI matches 
In ODI cricket, the highest total has been set by New Zealand against Pakistan when they scored 315/7 on 6 January 2018. The most runs scored in this ground have been by Martin Crowe (345 runs),  Andrew Jones (311 runs) and Nathan Astle (285 runs). The most wickets have been taken by Danny Morrison-16 wickets, Chris Harris-13 wickets and Gavin Larsen-12 wickets. Despite the propensity to score Test centuries, Basin Reserve is not a ground for scoring ODI centuries. Only 4 had ever been scored. The most recent was by Martin Guptill on 19 January 2018 against Pakistan, 43 years since Bevan Congdon done so. The only away batsman to score an ODI century here was Shoaib Mohammad of Pakistan in 1989.

See also

List of Test cricket grounds
List of international cricket centuries at Basin Reserve
List of international cricket five-wicket hauls at Basin Reserve

References

Bibliography
Neely, D., Romanos, J. (2003). The Basin: An Illustrated History of the Basin Reserve. Canterbury University Press. .

External links

Ground Profile at ESPNcricinfo
Quick information about the Basin Reserve.
"The Basin Reserve: from lagoon to land" at New Zealand Cricket Museum
"The Basin Reserve: cricket comes to play" at New Zealand Cricket Museum

1868 establishments in New Zealand
Heritage New Zealand Category 2 historic places in the Wellington Region
Test cricket grounds in New Zealand
Sports venues in Wellington City
Cricket grounds in New Zealand
1992 Cricket World Cup stadiums